FERM Power Tools World Rally Team is a Dutch rally team competing in the World Rally Championship. The team was formed in January 2011 for driver Dennis Kuipers's step up to the top level of rallying. The team is working in partnership with the British M-Sport operation, who run the Ford World Rally Team. The team takes its name from Ferm, a Dutch producer of electronic equipment and tools, based in Zwolle. The company is using the WRC to help promote its brand and products throughout the world. The team registered as a WRC Team, meaning it is eligible for manufacturers' championship points.

History
Since 2008 Kuipers had been competing in selected World Rally Championship events for the Ipatec Racing team with his father René Kuipers. For 2010 Dennis competed in eight WRC rounds in a Ford Fiesta S2000 entered by the Stobart M-Sport Ford Rally Team.

On 30 November 2010 it was announced that Kuipers would drive a Ford Fiesta RS WRC in the 2011 World Rally Championship season, run by Ipatec Racing in conjunction with M-Sport. On 10 January 2011 it was announced that the FERM Power Tools World Rally Team would be created for the new programme.

2011 season
The FERM Power Tools World Rally Team made its debut at the 2011 Rally Sweden. Kuipers finished the rally in 13th position, enough to give the team four manufacturer points.

WRC results

References

External links

FERM Power Tools World Rally Team

World Rally Championship teams
Dutch auto racing teams
Auto racing teams established in 2011